Etihad Towers is a complex of buildings with five towers in Abu Dhabi, the capital city of the United Arab Emirates.

Usage
The towers are located opposite the Emirates Palace hotel and feature offices, apartments and a hotel. The estimated cost for the construction was 2.5 billion Dirhams. Towers 2 and 5 topped out in November 2010.

A year later, in November 2011, the Jumeirah at Etihad Towers Hotel which belongs to Jumeirah Group was opened in Tower 1. Tori No Su Japanese restaurant opened within the hotel in 2012. The hotel has been rebranded to Conrad Abu Dhabi Etihad Towers which opened doors in Tower 1 on October 1, 2020. The adjacent Tower 2 is (as of January 2023) the fourth tallest in Abu Dhabi. Tower 2 has an observation deck named "Observation Deck at 300" on the 75th floor which is accessible from the hotel via a lower level linking podium.

The towers were used as a filming location for the 2015 film Furious 7. In the film, Dominic Toretto (Vin Diesel) and Brian O'Conner (Paul Walker) steal a Lykan HyperSport and drive it through three of the towers.

Architectural features 
 Tower 1: 69 floors, 
 Tower 2: 74 floors, 
 Tower 3: 54 floors, 
 Tower 4: 61 floors, 
 Tower 5: 55 floors,

See also
List of tallest buildings in Abu Dhabi
List of tallest buildings in the United Arab Emirates

References

External links
 ProTenders profile
 Etihadtowers.com
 Etihadtowers.net

2011 establishments in the United Arab Emirates
Mixed-use developments in the United Arab Emirates
Residential skyscrapers in Abu Dhabi
Skyscraper office buildings in Abu Dhabi
Skyscraper hotels in Abu Dhabi